Ipixuna is a municipality located in the Brazilian state of Amazonas. Its population was 30,436 (2020) and its area is 13,566 km².

The municipality contains 58.76% of the  Rio Gregório Extractive Reserve.

References

Municipalities in Amazonas (Brazilian state)
Road-inaccessible communities of Brazil